Michael Doman (25 January 1961 – 29 July 2018) was a South African cricketer. He played fourteen first-class cricket matches for Transvaal and Western Province between 1977 and 1983.

References

External links
 

1961 births
2018 deaths
South African cricketers
Gauteng cricketers
Western Province cricketers
Place of birth missing
South African sports journalists
White South African people